Hosenabad-e Pain (also Romanized as Ḩoşenābād-e Pā’īn; also known as Ḩoseynābād, Ḩoseynābād-e Jahāngīrkhān, Ḩoseynābād Jahāngīr Khān, and Husainābād) is a village in Yazdanabad Rural District, Yazdanabad District, Zarand County, Kerman Province, Iran. At the 2006 census, its population was 562, in 133 families.

References 

Populated places in Zarand County